Graharipu was a 10th-century Chudasama (Abhira) king of Saurashtra region of western India with his capital at Vamanasthali (now Vanthali). He was a contemporary of Mularaja, the first Chaulukya ruler of Anahilapataka (now Patan). Graharipu built or repaired Durgapalli, the ancient fort in Junagadh identified as Uparkot.

The Abhiras grew very powerful during the reign of Graharipu in the middle of the 10th century A.D. He had his capital at Vāmanasthali, now represented by Abhiras the village Vanthali, 9 miles west of Junagadh.

The growing power of the Chudasama dynasty and his acts of harassing the pilgrims to Somnath temple resulted in his conflict with Mularaja. After a major and decisive battle, Mulraja defeated Graharipu. The ruler from Kutch, Laksha had fought alongside Graharipu in the battle and was killed. After this battle, the Chudasama domain was repeatedly attacked by subsequent Chaulukya rulers.

Titles
Graharipu is sometimes described as Graharipu the Ahir.

Battle with Mularaja
According to Hemachandra, who was patronized by the Chaulukyas, the Chaulukya king Mularaja defeated Graharipu. No other Chaulukya-era accounts mention this victory.

According to Hemachandra, one night, Mahadeva appeared in Mularaja's dream, and ordered him to vanquish Graharipu. In the morning, Mularaja consulted his ministers Jambaka and Jehula, as he was apprehensive of causing troubles to the pilgrims who visited Prabhasa in Saurashtra. Jambaka was his Mahamantri (chief minister) while Jehula, the Ranaka of Kahiralu (now Kheralu), was his Mahapradhana (prime minister), according to Abhayatilakagani. Jehula told Mularaja that Graharipu was a tyrant who tortured pilgrims and indulged in vices such as eating flesh, drinking wine and hunting deer in sacred places. Jambaka described Graharipu as a very strong king, and declared that only Mularaja was capable of defeating him. Both the ministers urged Mularaja to attack Graharipu.

Mularaja launched a campaign against Graharipu on the day of Vijayadashami. Graharipu attempted a peaceful resolution through a messenger, who informed Mularaja that Graharipu had no enmity with him. However, Mularaja turned the messenger away, and continued his march. Graharipu then started his war preparations. His allies included Medas, his friend's son Laksha, and a king named Sindhuraja. After the war began, he was joined by a mlechchha chief (who according to the Hemachandra's commentator Abhayatilaka Gani, was a Turushka).

Mularaja was supported by the kings Gangamaha of Gangadvara and his younger brother, Mahirata, Revatimitra, and Shailaprastha. The Paramara king of Abu and Srimala also joined him. In addition, Mularaja was supported by the Bhillas and the Kauravas. After the battle began, several others including the king of Saptakashi and a number of Gujarati soldiers, joined him.

The battle took place on the river Jambumali (identified as Bhogavo river in Saurashtra on which banks a village named Jambu near Limbdi is located). The battle continued for two days indecisively. On third day, Mularaja entered battle on an elephant and Graharipu mounted on his elephant in rage. Mularaja overpowered Graharipu in a single combat and throw him down from his elephant, and had him tied up with ropes.

Laksha, wearing white clothes, rushed in and abused Mularaja calling him Mula. He asked Mularaja to release Graharipu, but Mularaja refused to comply, on the grounds that the captive was a beef-eater. This led to another single combat, in which Mularaja killed Laksha with a spear. The men of Saurashtra then made a submission before Mularaja, dressed as women. Queen and children of Graharipu request Mularaja to release him which he does. The king then released the prisoners and visited Prabhasa. According to Abhayatilakagani, Mularaja prayed on the day of Shivaratri. Within five-six days, Mularaja returned capital with 108 elephants.

The fight between Mularaja and Laksha has also been mentioned by the 14th century writer Merutunga in Prabandhachintamani. According to this version, Laksha (or Lakha) was the ruler of Kachchha. He was son of Phulada and Kamalata, daughter of Parmara king Kirtiraja. He had repulsed Mularaja's attacks 11 times. However, in their 12th fight, Mularaja besieged his fort Kapilkot (now Kera, Kutch), killed him, and trod him on his beard. Enraged by his insulting action, Laksha's mother cursed Mularaja's family to be afflicted with leprosy. The similar account is also given in Kumarapalacharita. According to K. K. Shastri, this account seem more trustworthy.

Laksha appears to be a historical character, as he has been mentioned in several other chronicles as well. The other kings listed by Hemachandra appear to be fictional names. Historian Asoke Majumdar theorizes that Mularaja attacked Graharipu on "some flimsy pretext", as Mahadeva's-order-in-a-dream was a popular device used by Sanskrit authors to justify the otherwise inexcusable actions of their heroes. Mularaja's descendants fought against the kings of Kachchha and Saurashtra, so it appears that he managed to subjugate these territories only partially.

In bardic literature
According to bardic tales, he was married to sister of Uga Vala,  the chief of Talaja.

According to bardic literature, Graharipu was the successor of Vishwavarah and he was succeeded by Kavat. He ruled possibly from 945 CE to 982 CE.

References

Bibliography

 

10th-century Indian monarchs
Chudasama dynasty